“Broken Love Song” is the second single released from Pete Doherty's debut album, Grace/Wastelands. It was not a commercial success, failing to chart in the UK Singles Chart. It was released on 3 August 2009.

Track listing

"Broken Love Song" – 3:42 (Doherty, Peter Wolfe)
"The Ballad of Grimaldi" – 4:07 (Doherty)

References

2009 singles
Pete Doherty songs
Songs written by Pete Doherty
2009 songs
Parlophone singles
Songs written by Peter Wolfe (musician)
Song recordings produced by Stephen Street